The Lake District National Park is a national park in North West England that includes all of the central Lake District, though the town of Kendal, some coastal areas, and the Lakeland Peninsulas are outside the park boundary.

The area was designated a national park on 9 May 1951 (less than a month after the first UK national park designation — the Peak District).  It retained its original boundaries until 2016 when it was extended by 3% in the direction of the Yorkshire Dales National Park to incorporate areas such as land of high landscape value in the Lune Valley.

It is the most visited national park in the United Kingdom with 16.4 million visitors per year and more than 24 million visitor-days per year, the largest of the thirteen national parks in England and Wales, and the second largest in the UK after the Cairngorms National Park. Its aim is to protect the landscape by restricting unwelcome change by industry or commerce. Most of the land in the park is in private ownership, with about 55% registered as agricultural land. Landowners include:
 Individual farmers and other private landowners, with more than half of the agricultural land farmed by the owners.
The National Trust owns around 25% of the total area (including some lakes and land of significant landscape value).
 The Forestry Commission and other investors in forests and woodland.
United Utilities (owns 8%)
 Lake District National Park Authority (owns 3.9%)

The National Park Authority is based at offices in Kendal. It runs a visitor centre on Windermere at a former country house called Brockhole, Coniston Boating Centre, and Information Centres.

In common with all other national parks in England, there is no restriction on entry to, or movement within the park along public routes, but access to cultivated land is usually restricted to public footpaths, bridleways and byways. Much of the uncultivated land has statutory open access rights, which cover around 50% of the park. The Coast to Coast Walk, which crosses the north of England from the Irish Sea to the North Sea, traverses the national park from west to east.

Farmland, settlement and mining have altered the natural scenery, and the ecology has been modified by human influence for millennia and includes important wildlife habitats. Having failed in a previous attempt to gain World Heritage Site status as a natural site, because of human activities, it was eventually successful in the category of cultural landscape and was awarded the status in 2017.

References

External links
 Lake District National Park Authority

Protected areas established in 1951
Lake District
National parks in England